The eleventh series of the British science fiction television programme Doctor Who premiered on 7 October 2018 and concluded on 9 December 2018. The series is the first to be led by Chris Chibnall as head writer and executive producer, alongside executive producers Matt Strevens and Sam Hoyle, after Steven Moffat and Brian Minchin stepped down after the tenth series. This series is the eleventh to air following the programme's revival in 2005 and is the thirty-seventh season overall. It also marks the beginning of the third production era of the revived series, following Russell T Davies' original run from 2005 to 2010, and Moffat's from 2010 to 2017. The eleventh series was broadcast on Sundays, a first in the programme's history; regular episodes of the revived era were previously broadcast on Saturdays. The series was followed by a New Year's Day special episode, "Resolution", instead of the traditional annual Christmas Day special.

The series introduces Jodie Whittaker as the Thirteenth Doctor, a new incarnation of the Doctor, an alien Time Lord who travels through time and space in her TARDIS, which appears to be a British police box on the outside. The series also introduces Bradley Walsh, Tosin Cole, and Mandip Gill as the Doctor's newest travelling companions, Graham O'Brien, Ryan Sinclair, and Yasmin Khan, respectively. The series follows the Thirteenth Doctor as she initially searches for her lost TARDIS, inadvertently bringing Graham, Ryan, and Yasmin with her on her travels. All three later contemplate returning to their normal lives but decide to continue travelling with the Doctor. Rather than an overall story arc similar to those in previous series, each episode of the series served mostly as a standalone story.

With the exception of Chibnall, every writer and director who worked on the eleventh series was new to the programme. The ten episodes were directed by Jamie Childs, Mark Tonderai, Sallie Aprahamian, and Jennifer Perrott, and written by Malorie Blackman, Ed Hime, Pete McTighe, Vinay Patel, Joy Wilkinson, and Chris Chibnall, who wrote five episodes for the series solo, co-writing an additional episode with Blackman. Filming for the series commenced in October 2017 and concluded in August 2018.

Episodes

For the first time since the seventh series, and thus the second time in the programme's history, each episode of the series served mostly as a standalone story with no multi-parters.

Casting

The series introduced Jodie Whittaker as the Thirteenth Doctor. Her predecessor Peter Capaldi departed from his role as the Twelfth Doctor after the tenth series, having played the role for three series. His final appearance was in the 2017 Christmas special, "Twice Upon a Time". Moffat stated in February 2017 that Chibnall tried to persuade the actor to continue into the eleventh series, but despite this, Capaldi still decided to depart.

The search for the actor to portray the Thirteenth Doctor, led by Chibnall, began later in 2017 after he completed work on the third series of the ITV series Broadchurch, for which he was also the head writer and executive producer. Chibnall had the final say on the actor, although the decision also involved Charlotte Moore and Piers Wenger, the director of content and head of drama for the BBC respectively. On 16 July 2017, it was announced after the 2017 Wimbledon Championships men's finals that Whittaker would portray the thirteenth incarnation of the Doctor.

After the tenth series concluded, it was confirmed that neither Matt Lucas nor Pearl Mackie would be reprising their roles for the eleventh series as companions Nardole and Bill Potts. Consequently, the eleventh series introduced a new set of companions, including Bradley Walsh, Tosin Cole, and Mandip Gill as Graham O'Brien, Ryan Sinclair, and Yasmin Khan, respectively. Walsh had been a favourite for the role since rumours of his casting began in August 2017. Actress Sharon D. Clarke also had a recurring role throughout the series as Graham's wife Grace.

On 8 March 2018, Alan Cumming announced that he had been cast as King James I in an episode of the series. On 25 March, comedian Lee Mack stated that he would make a brief appearance in one episode. Shaun Dooley also appeared in the series. In a "Coming Soon" vignette during the closing credits of the premiere episode, "The Woman Who Fell to Earth", a number of guest actors appearing in the remaining episodes of the series were shown: Mark Addy, Julie Hesmondhalgh, Shane Zaza, Shobna Gulati, Brett Goldstein, Josh Bowman, Siobhan Finneran, Lois Chimimba, Susan Lynch, Hamza Jeetooa (credited as Hamza Jeetoa), Art Malik, Suzanne Packer, Vinette Robinson, Amita Suman, Ben Bailey Smith, Phyllis Logan, and Chris Noth.

Production

Development
In April 2015, Steven Moffat confirmed that Doctor Who would run for at least another five years, extending the show until 2020. It was announced in January 2016 that the tenth series would be Moffat's final series as executive producer and head writer, after seven years as showrunner, for which he was replaced in the role by Chris Chibnall in 2018. Matt Strevens served as executive producer alongside Chibnall, as well as Sam Hoyle. With Moffat's departure from the role of head writer, he also stated in February 2017 that he was not planning to write in a regular capacity for the eleventh series.

The series consisted of 10 episodes, a shorter run compared to the 12 and 13 episodes that have comprised the previous ten series of the revived era. Episodes ran for an average of 50 minutes each, with the premiere running for 64 minutes, described by the BBC as "feature-length". Chibnall stated at the 2018 San Diego Comic-Con that each episode of the series was set to be a standalone story with no multi-parters.

Writing
In July 2018, it was announced that the writing team for the eleventh series would include people from black and minority ethnic backgrounds for the first time in the programme's history, including two women and three men contributing as guest writers, while the series as a whole would feature an equal split between female and male directors. All but one of the editors for the eleventh series were women. Chibnall and Strevens stated that it was a priority to have a diverse production team.

The writers and directors for the show were officially announced in an issue of Doctor Who Magazine in August 2018. Malorie Blackman, Ed Hime, Pete McTighe, Vinay Patel, and Joy Wilkinson all contributed scripts to the series.

In July 2018, Chibnall also stated that the series would not feature the Daleks; the following December, the BBC announced that the New Year's Day special would feature the return of the Daleks.

Design changes

A new logo was unveiled at the BBC Worldwide showcase on 20 February 2018. This logo was designed by the creative agency Little Hawk, who also created a stylised insignia of the word "who" enclosed in a circle with an intersecting line. Visual effects were done by the British company DNEG. The new opening title sequence was not included in the premiere episode, "The Woman Who Fell to Earth", and instead first appeared in the second episode, "The Ghost Monument".

Filming
Pre-production for the eleventh series began in late October 2017. Filming officially began on 31 October 2017, and concluded on 3 August 2018. Jamie Childs directed the first and ninth episode of the series in the opening production block, having directed Whittaker's introduction video as the Thirteenth Doctor. Sallie Aprahamian directed the third filming block, consisting of two episodes.

The eleventh series was shot using Cooke and Angénieux anamorphic lenses for the first time in the series' history, a creative decision made in order to make the show look more cinematic.

In November 2017, the production team visited parts of Sheffield, where they filmed a majority of "The Woman Who Fell To Earth". In January 2018, the cast and crew flew abroad to Cape Town, South Africa, where they filmed the exterior shots for the second episode, "The Ghost Monument". This was the first time that Doctor Who filmed there. In the same production block, the third episode, "Rosa", was also filmed in South Africa. In February 2018, the production team returned to Sheffield where they filmed parts of "Arachnids in the UK". The exterior of the Park Hill estate, Sheffield, was used prominently in the filming. In March 2018, the production team travelled to Gosport, where they filmed parts of "The Witchfinders". Australian director Jennifer Perrott visited the UK to film the fifth episode, "The Tsuranga Conundrum", along with the seventh episode "Kerblam!". The sixth episode, "Demons of the Punjab", was filmed in the Province of Granada, Spain.

A New Year's Day special episode, "Resolution", was filmed in 2018 in lieu of the traditional annual Christmas special.

Production blocks were arranged as follows:

Music
Murray Gold announced in February 2018 that he would step down as the programme's composer, having served as the musical director since 2005, and that he would not be composing the music for the eleventh series. On 26 June 2018, producer Chris Chibnall announced that the musical score for the eleventh series would be provided by Royal Birmingham Conservatoire alumnus Segun Akinola. "Glorious", by Macklemore and Skylar Grey, was used in a number of the trailers for the eleventh series.

Release

Promotion
On 16 July 2017, a minute-long clip was released  on the Doctor Who website, after the 2017 Wimbledon Championships men's finals, introducing Jodie Whittaker as the Thirteenth Doctor. The first teaser for the series was released during the final of the 2018 FIFA World Cup on 15 July 2018, almost exactly a year following the official announcement. Whittaker, Gill, Cole, Chibnall, and Strevens promoted the show with a panel at the San Diego Comic-Con on 19 July 2018, where the first trailer was released. The second trailer for the series was released on 20 September 2018. The premiere of the new series was held at The Moor, Sheffield on 24 September 2018, as part of a red carpet event for the first episode and eleventh series.

Broadcast
The eleventh series premiered on 7 October 2018 and concluded on 9 December 2018. The series was broadcast on Sundays; the move to Sundays was a first in the programme's history after regular episodes of the entire revived era were previously broadcast on Saturdays. However, the move from Saturdays was not a first in the programme's history, after episodes were moved from a Saturday broadcast to weeknights during the eras of the Fifth and Seventh Doctors.

"The Woman Who Fell to Earth" was released in the Brazilian cinemas on 7 October 2018, in Russian, Ukrainian, Belarusian, Kazakhstani, and Azerbaijani cinemas on 7–8 October, in select Australian cinemas on 8 October, and in the United States on 10–11 October.

Children in Need special
On 7 August 2018, it was reported by Cultbox that a sketch was recorded by the Doctor Who cast and crew for the 2018 Children in Need. The sketch aired during Children in Need on 16 November 2018, titled Anna's Doctor Who Surprise. Nine-year-old Anna Mark, who suffers from cystic fibrosis, and her brother Alex visited the TARDIS and the Doctor Who set in Cardiff, meeting Gill, Cole, Walsh, and Whittaker during their tour.

Home media 

The eleventh series was released on home media on 14 January 2019 in Region 2, with the 2019 special "Resolution" released separately on 18 February. "Resolution" was also included in the twelfth series box set, released in May 2020.

In print

Reception

Ratings
The premiere episode, "The Woman Who Fell to Earth", received a total of 10.96 million viewers, making it the highest series premiere for a Doctor in the history of the programme, and the highest consolidated ratings since "The Time of the Doctor" (2013). In December 2018, the BBC released details for the top ten requested episodes on iPlayer for the month of October; "The Woman Who Fell to Earth" ranked second with 2.96 million requests, with the premiere episode of Killing Eve ranking first. In January 2019, BBC released a report for BBC iPlayer requests in 2018; Doctor Who ranked as the fourth most popular series, according to the released figures.

Critical reception

Doctor Whos eleventh series has received positive reviews from critics. Series 11 holds a 90% approval rating on online review aggregate site Rotten Tomatoes with an average score of 7.37/10, based on 41 critic reviews. The site's consensus reads "Carried by Jodie Whittaker's boundless energy and charm, Doctor Whos latest regeneration manages to feel fresh well into its 55-year tenure." On Metacritic, the series holds a weighted average score of 78 out of 100 based on ten reviews, indicating "generally favorable reviews". 

Kaitlin Thomas of TV Guide praised Jodie Whittaker's "passion and fire", but felt the series was failing the companions; it "hasn't done much to develop them", and, "after four episodes, they're all still the same barely-there characters they were at the start".

Awards and nominations

Soundtrack
A singular soundtrack release, titled "Thirteen", the Thirteenth Doctor's theme, was released on 12 December 2018 by Silva Screen Records. 40 further selected pieces of score from this series as composed by Segun Akinola, were released in a 2-CD set on 11 January 2019 by Silva Screen Records, including two tracks from the 2019 New Year's special "Resolution".

Notes

References

2018 British television seasons
Series 11
Series 11